Westering Home is the ninth album by English saxophonist John Surman recorded in 1972 and released on the Island label. This is the first album where he used the possibilities of overdubbing and composing on the fly.

Reception

Jason Ankeny awards this album in his allmusic review four and a half stars and classifies it as Surman´s most melodic and soulful recording. He further states, "The album is vividly experimental yet deeply intimate – while previous LPs like How Many Clouds Can You See? seemed fascinated with the reaches of sound, here Surman turns inward to explore the heart and mind. At the same time, his playing boasts its signature physical prowess, but with a new economy of scale – his solos are honed to a razor's edge, and not a single note is superfluous."

Track listing
All compositions by John Surman.

Side one
 "Mock Orange" – 4:31
 "Whirligig" – 3:43
 "Jynjyg" – 5:42
 "The Druid" – 7:38
 "Outside The Scorpion" – 2:46

Side two
 "Walrus" – 4:00
 "Hornpipe" – 5:52
 "Watershed" – 6:05
 "Rill-A-Ree" – 6:46

Personnel
 John Surman – bass clarinet, euphonium, organ, percussion, piano, baritone sax, soprano sax, trumpet
 Robin Sylvester – engineering, recording, mixing
 Kenny Foster – photography

References

External links
 

John Surman albums
1972 albums
Island Records albums